The Canton of Vinça is a French former canton of the Pyrénées-Orientales department, in the Languedoc-Roussillon region. It had 11,502 inhabitants (2012). It was disbanded following the French canton reorganisation which came into effect in March 2015.

Composition
The canton of Vinça comprised 18 communes:

Vinça 
Baillestavy
Bouleternère
Boule-d'Amont
Casefabre
Espira-de-Conflent
Estoher
Finestret
Glorianes
Ille-sur-Têt
Joch
Marquixanes
Montalba-le-Château
Prunet-et-Belpuig
Rigarda
Rodès
Saint-Michel-de-Llotes
Valmanya

References

Vinca
2015 disestablishments in France
States and territories disestablished in 2015